MulticoreWare Inc is a software development company, offering products and services related to HEVC video compression, machine learning (specifically, convolutional neural networks), compilers for heterogeneous computing, and software performance optimization services. MulticoreWare's customers include AMD, Microsoft, Google, Qualcomm and Telestream. MulticoreWare was founded in 2009. Today it has offices in 3 countries – USA, China and India.

MulticoreWare was placed at 110 on the Inc. 5000 list of fastest growing private companies in America for the year 2014. St. Louis, Missouri based technology start-up accelerator ITEN listed the company in its list of top ten tech startups in the St. Louis area for three consecutive years (2012–2014). MulticoreWare was ranked the 22nd fastest growing private company in Silicon Valley by Silicon Valley Business Journal in October 2014. In July 2014, MulticoreWare was named to EE Times Silicon 60, a list of hot startups to watch. MulticoreWare Inc. was a Tie50 Awards Finalist at TiEcon2014.

In May 2020, MulticoreWare entered the AMD embedded platform ecosystem with its AI technologies that address workloads for machine learning, neural networks, image and video processing applications to serve  market segments such as: medical diagnostics, sports analytics, security & surveillance, robotics, and augmented reality.

Products

x265
MulticoreWare leads the development of the x265 HEVC encoder. x265 is based on the x264 H.264/MPEG-4 AVC encoder with a similar command-line syntax and feature set. x265 is offered under either the GNU General Public License (GPL) 2 license or a commercial license. In February 2014, Telestream's  Vantage Transcode Multiscreen became the first commercial product to introduce x265 encoding technology. In October 2015, the Video Group at Moscow State University identified x265 as having the highest overall efficiency in its first comparison of HEVC encoders.

LipSync
LipSync is a tool that automatically detects audio-video synchronization errors in video. By using machine learning and deep learning technologies, errors can be detected without digital fingerprinting or watermarking in the source video. It requires an Nvidia GPU, an AMD64 capable CPU, 16 GB of RAM and a Windows or Linux operating system.

UHDcode
MulticoreWare offers the UHDcode HEVC video decoder API, available on x86, ARM, Xbox 360 and PS3. It is OpenCL accelerated and supports HEVC Main/ Main10 profiles.

x265 HEVC Upgrade
In March 2015 MulticoreWare launched x265 HEVC Upgrade, which includes the x265 Encoder application and the UHDcode DirectShow filter, allowing HEVC video playback on 64-bit Windows Media Player.

Multicore Cross Platform Architecture
Multicore Cross Platform Architecture (MxPA) is a heterogeneous computing stack based on the LLVM framework, capable of supporting OpenCL, RenderScript, CUDA and C++ AMP.

HCC C++
HCC is an open source parallel C++ compiler for HSA and OpenCL 1.2. HCC provides compiler frontends for C++AMP, C++ source with parallel STL and OpenMP.

Software development services 

MulticoreWare has one of the world's largest heterogeneous computing teams across the globe and offers accelerated software development services. MulticoreWare is a Contributor Member of the Khronos Group and is active on several standards. Its full range of services include:  
GPU-accelerated software development
Multicore CPU application development
CUDA acceleration services for Nvidia GPUs
C++ AMP software development services
RenderScript Android acceleration
Xilinx Alliance Partner services
Convolutional neural networks

References 

Business software companies
Companies based in California
Technology companies established in 2009
Software companies of the United States
Technology companies of the United States
Web service providers